William Elijah Bloom (October 19, 1860 – November 27, 1938) was an American politician.

Bloom was born on a farm in Green County, Wisconsin and he moved with his parents and family to Nobles County, Minnesota in 1873. He went to the Nobles County public schools. Bloom lived in Worthington, Minnesota with his wife and family. Bloom served in the Minnesota House of Representatives from 1931 to 1934. He died in Nobles County.

References

1860 births
1938 deaths
People from Worthington, Minnesota
People from Green County, Wisconsin
Members of the Minnesota House of Representatives